Princess Josephine Friederike Luise of Baden (21 October 1813 – 19 June 1900) was Princess of Hohenzollern-Sigmaringen from 27 August 1848 to 7 December 1849 during the brief reign of her husband, Prince Karl Anton. Josephine was the second daughter of Charles, Grand Duke of Baden, and Stéphanie de Beauharnais. She was the mother of the first king of Romania, Carol I. Through her younger daughter Marie, she is the ancestress of the Belgian royal family and the grand ducal family of Luxembourg.

Life
On 21 October 1834 at Karlsruhe, she married Karl Anton Joachim Zephyrinus Friedrich Meinrad, Prince of Hohenzollern-Sigmaringen, son of Charles, Prince of Hohenzollern-Sigmaringen (1785–1853) and his wife  Princess Marie Antoinette Murat (1793–1847).

They had six children:	
Leopold, Prince of Hohenzollern (22 September 1835 – 8 June 1905) he married Infanta Antónia of Portugal on 12 September 1861. They had three sons, including Ferdinand I of Romania.
Princess Stephanie of Hohenzollern-Sigmaringen (15 July 1837 – 17 July 1859) she married King Pedro V of Portugal on 18 May 1858, without issue.
Carol I of Romania (27 April 1839 – 10 October 1914) he married Princess Elisabeth of Wied on 15 November 1869. They had one daughter.
Prince Anton of Hohenzollern-Sigmaringen (7 October 1841 – 6 August 1866) killed in the Austro-Prussian War at the age of twenty-four. 
Prince Frederick of Hohenzollern-Sigmaringen (25 June 1843 – 2 December 1904) he married Princess Louise of Thurn and Taxis on 21 June 1879, without issue.
Princess Marie of Hohenzollern-Sigmaringen (17 November 1845 – 26 November 1912) she married Prince Philippe, Count of Flanders on 25 April 1867. They had five children, including Albert I of Belgium.

She died at Sigmaringen on 19 June 1900. The Austrian court ordered a 12-day mourning for her death, during which members of the Habsburg dynasty were barred from participating in any festivities. This ensured that most members of the Habsburg imperial family were prevented from attending the wedding of Archduke Franz Ferdinand of Austria to Countess Sophie Chotek on 1 July.

Honours
 Dame of the Order of Louise.

Ancestry

References

Roberts, Gary Boyd, Notable Kin Volume Two, published in cooperation with the New England Historic and Genealogical Society, Boston, Massachusetts, by Carl Boyer, 3rd, Santa Clarita, California, 1999, volume 2, p. 220.

External links
 Staatsarchiv Sigmaringen
 Hausarchiv Hohenzollern-Sigmaringen: Nachlass Fürstin Josephine von Hohenzollern (1813-1900)

1813 births
1900 deaths
People from Mannheim
House of Zähringen
Princesses of Hohenzollern-Sigmaringen
Dames of the Order of Saint Isabel
Princesses of Baden
German people of French descent
Royal reburials
Daughters of monarchs